Susan Shreve (also known as Susan Richards Shreve) is an American novelist, memoirist, and children's book author. She has published fifteen novels, most recently More News Tomorrow (2019), and a memoir Warm Springs: Traces of a Childhood (2007). She has also published thirty books for children, most recently The Lovely Shoes (2011), and edited or co-edited five anthologies. Shreve co-founded the Master of Fine Arts (MFA) in Creative Writing program at George Mason University in 1980, where she teaches fiction writing. She is the co-founder and the former chairman of the PEN/Faulkner Foundation. She lives in Washington, D.C.

Early life
Susan Richards Shreve was born May 2, 1939 in Toledo, Ohio, but moved with her family to Washington, D.C. at the age of three. She attended and graduated from Sidwell Friends School in 1957.

Education 
Shreve received a BA in English from the University of Pennsylvania in 1961, and an MA in English from the University of Virginia in 1969.

Career 
She founded the Master of Fine Arts in Creative Writing program at George Mason University in 1980 and has taught there ever since. She has been a visiting professor at Columbia School of the Arts, Princeton University, and Goucher College. She has received a Guggenheim Award for Fiction, a National Endowment grant for Fiction, the Jenny Moore Chair in Creative Writing at George Washington University, the Grub Street Prize for non-fiction, the Poets and Writers’ Service award, and the Sidwell Friends School Outstanding Alumni Award. In 1980, Shreve co-founded the PEN/Faulkner Foundation, which presents the PEN/Faulkner Award for Fiction annually.

Shreve published her first novel, A Fortunate Madness, in 1974. Thirteen novels have followed. She published a novel Glimmer under the pseudonym Annie Waters in 1997. Shreve wrote about her experience as a patient at FDR's polio clinic in her memoir Warm Springs: Traces of a Childhood (2007). Her most recent novel, More News Tomorrow, was published in 2019.

Shreve's children's books include the Joshua T. Bates series (1984-2000), Blister (2001), an ALA Notable Book and a Publishers Weekly Best Children's Book, and most recently The Lovely Shoes (2011). When writing for young readers, she publishes as Susan Shreve.

Works

Novels 
 More News Tomorrow, New York: W W Norton, 2019.  
You Are the Love of My Life New York : W W Norton, 2012. , 
 A Student of Living Things, New York, N.Y.: Plume, 2007. , 
  Plum and Jaggers Seattle, WA : AmazonEncore, 2001. , 
  Glimmer, New York : Berkley Books, 1997.
 The Visiting Physician New York: N.A. Talese, 1996. , 
  The Train Home New York : Ivy Books, 1993. , 
 Daughters of the New World New York : Ballantine Books, 1994. , 
  A Country of Strangers Sceptre, 1990. , 
  Queen of Hearts New York : Pocket Books, 1988. , 
 Dreaming of Heroes New York : Berkley Books, 1984. , 
  Miracle Play New York : Playboy, 1982. , 
  Children of Power New York : Berkley Books, 1979. , 
 A Woman Like That] New York : Atheneum, 1977; London : H. Hamilton, 1978. , 
  A fortunate madness Boston, Houghton Mifflin, 1974. ,

Memoir 
Warm Springs : Traces of a Childhood at Fdr's Polio Haven, Boston : Mariner Books, 2008.

Edited Anthologies 
  Dream Me Home Safely: Writers on Growing up in America 	Boston : Houghton Mifflin, 2003. , 
 With son Porter Shreve: 
 Tales out of School: Contemporary Writers on Their Student Years (2000)
 How We Want to Live: Narratives on Progress (1998)
 Outside the Law: Narratives on Justice (1997)
 With Marita Golden: 
 Skin Deep: Black Women and White Women Write About Race (1995)

Novels for Children (as Susan Shreve) 
 The search for Baby Ruby, New York, NY : Arthur A. Levine Books, 2015.  , 
 The Lovely Shoes New York : Arthur A. Levine Books, 2011. , 
 Under the Watson's Porch (2004)
  Trout and Me New York : Dell Yearling, 2002. , 
  Blister, New York : Scholastic Signature, 2001. ,  companion novel to Jonah, the Whale 
  Ghost Cats] New York : Scholastic, 2000. , 
  Jonah, the Whale New York : Scholastic, 1999. , 
Joshua T. Bates takes charge Dan Andreasen illustrator, New York : Dell Yearling, 1997. , 
 Warts,  illustrated by Gregg Thorkelson (1996)
  The Goalie New York : Morrow Junior ; London : Hi Marketing, 1999. , 
 Zoe and Columbo], illustrated by Gregg Thorkelson, New York : Tambourine Books, 1995. , 
 The Formerly Great Alexander Family,  illustrated by Chris Cart, New York : Tambourine Books, 1995. , 
 Lucy Forever, Miss Rosetree, and the Stolen Baby, illustrated by Eric Jon Nones, New York: Tambourine Books, 1994. , 
 Amy Dunn Quits School, illustrated by Diane de Groat (1993)
 Wait for Me, illustrated by Diane de Groat, New York : Tambourine Books, 1992. , 
 The Gift of the Girl Who Couldn't Hear (1991)
 Lily and the Runaway Baby, illustrated by Sue Truesdell, New York : Random House, 1987. , 
  Lucy Forever and Miss Rosetree, Shrinks 	Beech Tree Bks, 1997. , 
  How I Saved the World on Purpose], illustrated by Suzanne Richardson, New York : Holt, Rinehart, and Winston, 1985. , 
 The Bad Dreams of a Good Girl, illustrated by Diane de Groat, New York, N.Y. : Beech Tree Books, 1993. , 
 The Revolution of Mary Leary (1982)
 The Masquerade New York, N.Y. : Dell, 1980. , 
 Family Secrets: Five Very Important Stories, illustrated by Richard Cuffari (1979)
 Loveletters (1978)
 The Nightmares of Geranium Street (1977)

Personal life 
She married Porter Shreve, with whom she had four children. Shreve later married noted literary agent Timothy Seldes. Her oldest son is the author Porter Shreve.

References

External links

http://english.gmu.edu/people/sshreve

Year of birth missing (living people)
20th-century American novelists
21st-century American novelists
American women novelists
American children's writers
Edgar Award winners
University of Pennsylvania alumni
University of Virginia alumni
George Mason University faculty
Living people
American women children's writers
20th-century American women writers
21st-century American women writers
Novelists from Virginia
American women academics